Alexander Preinfalk (6 February 1920 – 12 December 1944) was a Luftwaffe ace and recipient of the Knight's Cross of the Iron Cross during World War II.  The Knight's Cross of the Iron Cross was awarded to recognise extreme battlefield bravery or successful military leadership.  Alexander Preinfalk was shot down on 12 December 1944 by an American P-47 over Bruchsal, Germany and died after he bailed out.  He was credited with between 78 and 85+ aerial victories.

Summary of military career

Aerial victory claims
According to US historian David T. Zabecki, Preinfalk was credited with 85 aerial victories.

Awards
 Flugzeugführerabzeichen
 Front Flying Clasp of the Luftwaffe
 Ehrenpokal der Luftwaffe (13 September 1942)
 Iron Cross (1939) 2nd and 1st Class
 German Cross in Gold on 3 October 1942 as Unteroffizier in the II./Jagdgeschwader 77
 Knight's Cross of the Iron Cross on 14 October 1942 as Unteroffizier and pilot in the 5./Jagdgeschwader 77

References

Citations

Bibliography

External links
Luftwaffe 1939–1945 History
TracesOfWar.com

1920 births
1944 deaths
Military personnel from Baku
German World War II flying aces
Recipients of the Gold German Cross
Recipients of the Knight's Cross of the Iron Cross
Luftwaffe personnel killed in World War II
Aviators killed by being shot down
Russian people of German descent